The austral blackbird (Curaeus curaeus) is a species of bird in the family Icteridae. It is found in Argentina and Chile. Its natural habitats are temperate forests, subtropical or tropical high-altitude shrubland, and heavily degraded former forest.

References

austral blackbird
austral blackbird
Birds of Chile
Birds of Tierra del Fuego
austral blackbird
Taxonomy articles created by Polbot